was a Japanese political activist and ultra-nationalist.

Early life

Tachibana came from a samurai family, although his father was a fabric merchant.

During his time of higher education, his ideals of politics emerged. Deriving from the thoughts of Tolstoi, Gandhi, Kita Ikki and Western socialism, he developed the thought of agrarian, radical humanism and anti-capitalistic ideas. He argued that radical, violent change was needed to cleanse ‘the world of national politics...poisoned by mammon and the gang of corrupt industrialists’.

Political action

In the 1920s and 1930s, he sought have direct and violent action against the existing government. By inspiring sympathetic and young officers, they conspired together to arrange the assassination of Prime Minister Inukai Tsuyoshi during the May 15 Incident and was sentenced to life imprisonment, serving eight years. He met Aikido founder Morihei Ueshiba during this time period.

He was also involved in the bombing attacks on the Seiyūkai headquarters, one of the leading political parties at the time, and on the Mitsui Bank in Tokyo.

Political beliefs

Tachibana, noted to be a romantic and Utopian thinker, his primary aim was to "liberate the people" from a false governance. During a time where Western concepts such as capitalism globalized the Japanese markets, the rural villages were forced to adapt to this rapid change of increasing goods, causing the destruction of the conventional community life. This caused the privileged classes and political parties to rob Japan of its basic principles such as social existence. Therefore, Tachibana believed that for the development of the Asian and Western societies, the village community was the original starting point of civilization and the only way for the country to prosper.

Tachibana called for the formation of a "patriotic brotherhood" to unselfishly lay down their lives to save the people in accordance to the emperor's wishes. Wanting to recruit form all social classes, the brotherhood would represent a more perfect whole, signified by the imperial will.

References

Japanese activists
1893 births
1974 deaths
Japanese fascists